Masud Akhond (born 14 October 1972) is a Bangladeshi actor, director and writer. he won Bachsas Awards Best Actor for his performance in the film Pita (2013) and Jury Prize from San Francisco International Film Festival in 2013 documentary Slave Queen.

Films
 Pita, actor, director, writer, cinematographer.
 Ghetuputra Komola, actor.
 Madhumati, actor.
 Krishnopokkho, actor.
Shopno Poka (upcoming). director.

Awards
 Bachsas Awards Best Actor Pita
 Jury Prize from San Francisco International Film Festival in 2013. documentary Slave Queen.
 Nominated Meril Prothom Alo Awards Bangladesh 2012 Best Director & Best Actor

References

External links

Bangladeshi actors
Bangladeshi film directors
1972 births

Living people